Hypsidia robinsoni is a moth in the family Drepanidae. B.S. Hacobian described it in 1986. It is found in Australia, where it has been recorded from northern Queensland.

References

Moths described in 1986
Thyatirinae